Denis Scheck (born 15 December 1964) is a German literary critic, journalist, television presenter and former translator.

Biography
Born in Stuttgart, he studied German studies, contemporary history and political science at the universities of Tübingen, Düsseldorf and Dallas, and earned a master's degree at the University of Texas at Dallas. He was a Visiting Professor at the University of Göttingen in 2004.

Scheck has been a literary agent, translator of American and British authors, publisher and independent critic. In 1997, he was appointed literary editor at Deutschlandfunk. He has presented the ARD programme Druckfrisch since February 2003.

Controversy 
Scheck criticized the decision by German publisher Thienemann to change racist and racially insensitive terms in newer editions of children's books by Otfried Preußler and Astrid Lindgren. In response, and as an act of protest, in January 2013, he appeared on TV in blackface. Scheck, who describes himself as a critic of political correctness and censorship in the literary world, does, however, condemn the use of racist terms in contemporary and everyday language.

Publications 
 1993: King Kong, Spock & Drella – ein Lexikon amerikanischer Trivialmythen
 1994: Hell's Kitchen – Streifzüge durch die zeitgenössische US-Literatur
 2011: Sie & Er, der kleine Unterschied beim Essen und Trinken
 2014: Kurt Vonnegut 
 2019: Schecks Kanon: Die 100 wichtigsten Werke der Weltliteratur

Television 
 Druckfrisch (since 2003)
 Lesenswert Quartett (since 2014)
 Lesenswert (since 2016)
 Kunscht! (2016–2018)

Honours 
 Kritikerpreis des Deutschen Anglistentages, 2000
 Übersetzerbarke des Deutschen Literaturübersetzerverbandes, 2007
 Hanns-Joachim-Friedrichs-Award, 2012
 Bavarian TV Awards, 2013
 Hildegard von Bingen Prize for Journalism, 2014
 Julius-Campe-Preis, 2015

References

External links 

Moderation des ARD-Büchermagazins Druckfrisch

1964 births
German literary critics
Living people
German journalists
German male journalists
German translators
German male writers
ARD (broadcaster) people